The Devil-Stone is a 1917 American silent romance film directed by Cecil B. DeMille, co-written by his mother Beatrice deMille and Jeanie MacPherson, and starring Geraldine Farrar. The film had sequences filmed in the Handschiegl Color Process (billed as the "DeMille-Wyckoff Process"). Only two of six reels are known to survive, in the American Film Institute Collection at the Library of Congress. This was the last of Farrar's films for Paramount Pictures.

Plot
As described in a film magazine, Silas Martin (Marshall), a miser, marries Marcia Manot (Farrar) in order to gain possession of a valuable emerald she owns that once belonged to a Norse queen and is now cursed. After the wedding Marcia learns the true side of her husband and realizes that the marriage was a mistake. Silas steals the stone and places Marcia and Guy Sterling (Reid), his business partner, in a false light in order to get a divorce. Marcia sneaks in one night and discovers that Silas has the stone. She gains possession of it, but Silas attempts to regain it. They struggle, and Marcia kills him in self-defense. Sterling is accused of the murder, but the evidence clears him and the crime remains a mystery. Sterling marries Marcia and has an expert criminologist investigate the murder. He traces the crime to Marcia and, when confronted, she confesses. He gives her one month's leave of absence, after which she is to turn herself into the law. Marcia returns to her old home and gives the priest the emerald so he can make provision for homeless orphans. She returns and gives herself up to the criminologist. However, finding that her good deed has redeemed her, the criminologist does not turn her over to the law, and she and Sterling are happily reunited.

Cast
 Geraldine Farrar as Marcia Manot
 Wallace Reid as Guy Sterling
 Hobart Bosworth as Robert Judson
 Tully Marshall as Silas Martin
 James Neill as Simpson
 Mabel Van Buren
 Lillian Leighton
 Gustav von Seyffertitz as Stephen Densmore
 Horace B. Carpenter
 Ernest Joy
 Burwell Hamrick
 Raymond Hatton
 Theodore Roberts

See also
List of early color feature films
List of incomplete or partially lost films

References

External links

1917 films
1917 romantic drama films
1910s color films
American silent feature films
American black-and-white films
American romantic drama films
American mystery films
Films directed by Cecil B. DeMille
Lost American films
1910s American films
Silent romantic drama films
Silent mystery films
Silent American drama films